Margaret Jean Roberts Legum (8 October 1933, Pretoria, South Africa – 1 November 2007, Cape Town, South Africa) was a South African/British anti-apartheid activist and social reformer, who specialized in economics.

Legum attended Rhodes University and Newnham College where she studied economics. Legum married Colin Legum in 1960 and they moved to London.

Margaret Legum died in 2007, aged 74, from cancer, survived by her three daughters and grandchildren.

Works 
Legum was a founder of the South African New Economics Network. Her book, It Doesn't Have To Be Like This: Global Economics - A New Way Forward (2003), was written based on a series of lectures she gave at the University of Cape Town.

She was well known for a 1963 book on the necessity of economic sanctions against South Africa, South Africa: Crisis for the West, which she co-wrote with her husband, Colin.

References

External links
Margaret Legum's Last Journey (video)

1933 births
2007 deaths
White South African anti-apartheid activists
20th-century British economists
British women economists
South African women economists
20th-century South African economists
Academics of the London School of Economics
People from Pretoria
South African educators
South African journalists
Deaths from cancer in South Africa
Rhodes University alumni
Cambridge College alumni
20th-century British journalists